The Indifferent eel (Ethadophis akkistikos) is a species of eels in the family Ophichthidae (worm/snake eels). It was described by John E. McCosker and James Erwin Böhlke in 1984. It is a marine, tropical eel which is known from the western central Atlantic Ocean, including Panama, Nicaragua, Suriname, and Texas, USA.

The Indifferent eel is currently listed as Data Deficient at the IUCN redlist, due to there being few known specimens, and thereby a lack of certain information on the extent of its distribution and possible threats.

References

Ophichthidae
Fish described in 1984